Carl Calvin Richardson (born July 15, 1921) is an American former football coach. He served as the sixth head coach for Eastern New Mexico University in Portales, New Mexico and held that position for ten seasons, from 1954 until 1963. His overall coaching record at Eastern NMU was 57 wins, 37 losses, and 3 ties. This ranks him third at Eastern NMU in terms of total wins and fifth at Eastern NMU in terms of winning percentage.

In 1957 the team completed an undefeated season under Richardson.  The 44-member squad finished with a record of 9-0-1, the one tie resulting from a 14-14 match with Southwestern Oklahoma. 

In 1987, Richardson was inducted into the Eastern New Mexico University Greyhounds Hall of Fame. At the time, Richardson was residing in Portales, New Mexico. He retired in 1989.

References

1921 births
Living people
Eastern New Mexico Greyhounds football coaches